Pancornus is an extinct genus from the nautiloid order Discosorida that lived during the Late Devonian. Pancornus was named by F.A. Zhuravleva in 1972, and is contemporary with other late discosorids such as Parevlanoceras and Raphanites.

References

 Sepkoski, J.J. Jr. 2002. A compendium of fossil marine animal genera. D.J. Jablonski & M.L. Foote (eds.). Bulletins of American Paleontology 363: 1–560. Sepkoski's Online Genus Database (CEPHALOPODA) 

Prehistoric nautiloid genera
Late Devonian animals
Discosorida